Plocaederus dozieri is a species of beetle in the family Cerambycidae.

References

Plocaederus
Beetles described in 2010